Bakel Department is one of the 45 departments of Senegal and one of the four making up the Tambacounda Region in the east of the country. The department had an area of 22,378 km² and population estimate at 215,680 in 2005. However, in 2008 the department was split to form the new department of Goudiry, so the area was reduced to estimated 6,290 km².

The department has three urban communes; Bakel, Diawara and Kidira.

The rest of the department is divided administratively into three arrondissements which in turn are divided into rural communities (communautés rurales):

 Bélé Arrondissement
 Bélé
 Sinthiou Fissa
 Kéniaba Arrondissement
 Toumboura
 Sadatou
 Madina Foulbé
 Gathiary
 Moudéry Arrondissement 
 Moudéry
 Ballou
 Gabou

Historic Sites
 René Caillé Pavilion in Bakel town
 Bakel Fort in Bakel town
 Cemetery of the Circumcised in Bakel town
 Previous "Comptoir" of the Maurel & Prom establishment in Bakel town
 Sacred hill of Ngoundéiny Guidimpalé in Bakel town
 Fort of Sénédébou, Arrondissement of Kidira
 Hill of Wouro Himadou and (purported) tomb of Malick Sy, first Almamy (muslim ruler) of the Bundu

References

Departments of Senegal
Tambacounda Region